Dodge Correctional Institution (DCI) is an adult male maximum-security correctional facility operated by the Wisconsin Department of Corrections Division of Adult Institutions in Waupun, Wisconsin, US. The facility was converted from the Central State Hospital for the Criminally Insane to an adult correctional facility in 1977 at a cost of $2.47 million of general obligation bonds, as authorized by Chapter 29 of the Laws of 1977. The first two inmates were transferred from the nearby Waupun Correctional Institution to DCI on May 15, 1978. On October 29, 1993, ground was broken for a $45 million expansion which more than doubled the size of the facility. On June 17, 1996, the first female was admitted to DCI making it the only reception center for both male and female adult felons committed to the Wisconsin Department of Corrections. DCI served as the reception center for both males and females until December 1, 2004, when the female reception center moved to the Taycheedah Correctional Institution. DCI also serves as the central medical center for the division, providing both in-patient and out-patient care for male and female inmates.

Notable current and former inmates
Steven Avery – convicted murderer, subject of Netflix documentary, Making a Murderer.
Ed Gein – murderer, grave robber, incarcerated when the institution was Central State Hospital.
Jake Patterson – murderer and kidnapper, since relocated to a New Mexico prison.
John Flammang Schrank – attempted assassin of Theodore Roosevelt was at Central State Hospital and died there.
Chai Vang, convicted of murdering six people, since relocated to Iowa State Penitentiary.
Chris Watts – perpetrator of the Watts family murders, relocated from Colorado Department of Corrections.
Chandler Halderson, convicted of murdering and dismembering his parents.
Darrell Brooks Jr. – convicted on 76 counts, including six counts of first degree intentional homicide, 61 counts of reckless endangerment of others, 6 counts of hit and run ending in death, 2 counts of felony bail jumping, and 1 count of battery on his former girlfriend Erika Patterson and in the Waukesha Christmas parade attack.

References

External links
Dodge Correctional Institution

Prisons in Wisconsin
Buildings and structures in Dodge County, Wisconsin
1978 establishments in Wisconsin